Guacamayas is a town and municipality in the Colombian Department of Boyacá, part of the subregion of the Gutiérrez Province.

External links
 Guacamayas official website
Guacamayas'crafts store website

Municipalities of Boyacá Department